Culex (Eumelanomyia) castrensis is a species of mosquito belonging to the genus Culex. It is found in India, and Sri Lanka

References

castrensis
Insects described in 1922